Dockenfield is a linear settlement and rural civil parish in the borough of Waverley in Surrey, England.  The parish is undulating, has a number of sources of the River Wey and borders the Alice Holt Forest.

Until 1894 it had an unusual county, as a tything in Hampshire that was part of the parish of Frensham – Frensham's lands were part of Farnham at the Norman Conquest and supported the Bishops of Winchester who lived at Farnham Castle after one arranged its construction in 1138 – in 1239 Frensham gained its own parish, its ecclesiastical parish as used by the Church of England.

History

Dockenfield, was one of the unnamed tythings of Farnham owned by the Bishop of Winchester in 1086 and the Domesday Book confirms the tythings as his at the time of the Norman Conquest.  At that time the area's largely agricultural workers rendered £55, much more than £ per year to him (based on inflation since 1264 starting year for UK economic valuations). The Bishop of Winchester built Farnham Castle to live in, and he and his successors did so from 1138.

In 1239 the ecclesiastical parish was created and first church built, which still remains the parish in Anglicanism: Frensham, Surrey.

It was recorded in the Calendar of the Close Rolls (i.e. of letters close) of Edward III (r.1327–1377) as "Dockenfield, Dokkenfeld, co. Southampton".  In 1866 its civil parish was created.

In 1887 John Bartholomew's Gazetteer of the British Isles devoted a short sentence to describe it as a parish in North Hants.  SW. of Farnham railway station covering  with a population of 209.  This area remained constant from 1881 to 1961.

In 1881, at the time of its census, 43% of men were employed in agriculture, 6% were employed in domestic or furnishing occupations; various other categories follow, ended by the smallest percentages 2% were in each of the categories of transport and communications, 2% were 'professionals'.  15% of men did not specify an occupation. At that time the greatest percentage of employment for women was unknown (27%) followed by domestic service or similar, however only 4% of women of the parish were in that category.

Geography
The west of the parish adjoins Alice Holt Forest, part of the South Downs National Park.

The east of the parish is marked by the River Wey (south branch) middle of the parish forms a ridge crowned by two small knolls; all of the parish drains into this watercourse, but in the south of the parish the land slopes to the south, whereas in the north an east-west stream rising in the parish drains the main settled part of the village, which is in terms of its housing, a linear settlement with four settled cul-de-sacs.

Landmarks
Dockenfield has no listed buildings or parks (public or private).  The Church of the Good Shepherd, built 1910, by the English architect William Curtis Green,
village hall and war memorial on The Street connect religious and secular occasions to the village's established community.

Demography and housing
Historic
The population in 2001 of 421 decreased in the ten years to the United Kingdom Census 2011 by 22. The percentage of residents in 2011 who responded that they were in very good health, 58.9% was above the average for the district, region and country – 11.7% higher than the country as a whole.

The number of homes rose, following a slight decrease at the end of the Victorian period from 59 in 1901 to 98 in 1961.  The population gradually rose to reach a peak of 519 in 1951 living in only 97 homes and decreased to 406 over the following ten years.

Current

The average level of accommodation in the region composed of detached houses was 28%, the average that was apartments was 22.6%.

The proportion of households in the civil parish who owned their home outright compares to the regional average of 35.1%.  The proportion who owned their home with a loan compares to the regional average of 32.5%.  The remaining % is made up of rented dwellings (plus a negligible % of households living rent-free).

Governance
Before 1894 Dockenfield was a border parish in northeast Hampshire.  That year it gained a Rural District Council which lasted for one year. It forms part of the Waverley ward of 'Frensham, Dockenfield and Tilford' – the council offices in Godalming, which is also the post town.

At Surrey County Council the area is served by the councillor for Waverley Western Villages.

References

Borough of Waverley
Villages in Surrey
Civil parishes in Surrey